Grady Diploma "Dip" Orange (March 22, 1900 – September 21, 1946) was an American baseball infielder in the Negro leagues. He played from 1925 to 1931, playing with the Birmingham Black Barons, Kansas City Monarchs, Cleveland Tigers, and Detroit Stars. After baseball, Orange graduated from medical school.

References

External links
 and Baseball-Reference Black Baseball stats and Seamheads
Negro League Baseball Museum

1900 births
1946 deaths
Birmingham Black Barons players
Detroit Stars players
Kansas City Monarchs players
Baseball players from Texas
African-American physicians
20th-century American physicians
People from Terrell, Texas
20th-century African-American sportspeople
Baseball infielders